Forkhead box protein P1 is a protein that in humans is encoded by the FOXP1 gene. FOXP1 is necessary for the proper development of the brain, heart, and lung in mammals.  It is a member of the large FOX family of transcription factors.

Function 
This gene belongs to subfamily P of the forkhead box (FOX) transcription factor family. Forkhead box transcription factors play important roles in the regulation of tissue- and cell type-specific gene transcription during both development and adulthood. Forkhead box P1 protein contains both DNA-binding- and protein-protein binding-domains. This gene may act as a tumor suppressor as it is lost in several tumor types and maps to a chromosomal region (3p14.1) reported to contain a tumor suppressor gene(s). Alternative splicing results in multiple transcript variants encoding different isoforms.

Foxp1 is a transcription factor; specifically it is a transcriptional repressor.  Fox genes are part of a forkhead DNA-binding domain family.  This domain binds to sequences in promoters and enhancers of many genes.  Foxp1 regulates a variety of important aspects of development including tissue development of: the lungs, brain, thymus and heart.  In the heart Foxp1 has 3 vital roles, these include the regulation of cardiac myocyte maturation and proliferation, outflow tract separation of the pulmonary artery and aorta, and expression of Sox4 in cushions and myocardium.  Foxp1 is also an important gene in muscle development of the esophagus and esophageal epithelium.  Foxp1 is also an important regulator of lung airway morphogenesis. Foxp1 knockout embryos display severe defects in cardiac morphogenesis.  A few of these defects include myocyte maturation and proliferation defects that cause a thin ventricular myocardial compact zone, non-separation of the pulmonary artery and aorta, and cardiomyocyte proliferation increase and defective differentiation.  These defects, caused by Foxp1 inactivation, lead to fetal death. Disruptions of FoxP1 have been identified in very rare human patients and – similarly to FoxP2 - lead to cognitive dysfunction, including intellectual disability and autism spectrum disorder, together with language impairment.

It was shown that the embryonic stem cell (ESC)-specific isoform of FOXP1 stimulates the expression of transcription factor genes required for pluripotency, including OCT4, NANOG, NR5A2, and GDF3, while concomitantly repressing genes required for ESC differentiation. This isoform also promotes the maintenance of ESC pluripotency and contributes to efficient reprogramming of somatic cells into induced pluripotent stem cells. These results reveal a pivotal role for an Alternative splicing event in the regulation of pluripotency through the control of critical ESC-specific transcriptional programs.

See also 
 FOXP2
 FOXP3

References

Further reading

External links 
 Further clinical details at OMIM Entry #613670 (Mental Retardation With Language Impairment and with or without Autistic Features)
 Additional information also at OMIM Entry #605515 (Forkhead Box P1)
 
 
 Information for families and people impacted by FOXP1 syndrome can be found at the International FOXP1 Foundation site.

Forkhead transcription factors